Littoridinops monroensis is a species of very small aquatic snail, an operculate gastropod mollusk in the family Hydrobiidae.

Distribution

Description 
The maximum recorded shell length is 4.5 mm.

Habitat 
Minimum recorded depth is 0 m. Maximum recorded depth is 0.3 m.

References

External links
 

Hydrobiidae
Gastropods described in 1863
Taxa named by Georg Ritter von Frauenfeld